The 1919–20 Sheffield Shield season was the 24th season of the Sheffield Shield, the domestic first-class cricket competition of Australia. New South Wales won the championship by virtue of finishing with a better average. First-class cricket had resumed in Australia for the 1918–19 season, but the Sheffield Shield was not contested.

Table

Statistics

Most Runs
Roy Park 586

Most Wickets
Stork Hendry 22

References

Sheffield Shield
Sheffield Shield
Sheffield Shield seasons